Torjus Hansén (born 29 October 1973) is a Norwegian former professional footballer who played as a defender.

Club career
Hansén was born in Skien. He formerly played for Gulset, Lillestrøm, Arminia Bielefeld, and Rosenborg. For his last club Odd Grenland, has played total eleven seasons, and 267 matches and scoring 6 goals. He retired after the 2010 season. On 8 February 2011, he sign a contract until 1 August 2011. On 1 August 2011, he retired from football.

International career
He also played three matches for the national team, and three for the under-21.

References

External links
 

1973 births
Living people
Association football defenders
Norwegian footballers
Norway international footballers
Norway youth international footballers
Norway under-21 international footballers
Norwegian expatriate footballers
Expatriate footballers in Germany
Arminia Bielefeld players
Lillestrøm SK players
Odds BK players
Rosenborg BK players
Eliteserien players
Bundesliga players
Sportspeople from Skien